The State of Jiang (/Pinyin: Jiāng), also known as the State of Hong during the Shang Dynasty or the State of Qiong in some historical sources, was a vassal state in China that encompasses the southeastern Henan from 1101 BCE to 623 BCE. The nation was ruled by the Ying Family, and the state name is widely believed to be the origin of the Chinese surname Jiang. The swan goose was the totem of the state.

History

Early History (Before 1045 BCE) 
In 1101 BCE, Yu the Great, the leader of China under the Xia Dynasty allocated a piece of land on the riverbanks of the Huai River to Genchu under the Fengjian system. Genchu was the son of Boyi, a legendary tribal leader who was loyal to Yu the Great, and the allocation of the land to Genchu was mainly for rewarding Boyi's family for Boyi's exemplary achievements in controlling the Great Flood. Chinese historian Guangyue He believes that the state was part of Dongyi, a group of tribes in eastern China during the Pre-Qin Era, and moved southwards to modern-day Henan after the Zhou conquest of the Dongyi. The state was made a vassal state of the Zhou Dynasty during the era of King Cheng, and during the era of King Mu, the state expanded westwards into parts of Zhongyuan

As a vassal state of the Zhou Dynasty 
According to the Records of the Grand Historian and Shiben, the State of Jiang was located in the southeastern part of Zhengyang County near the northern riverbanks of the Huai River during the Zhou Dynasty. The capital of Jiang at the time was a rectangular plot of land measuring 175,000 m² in size and existed until the Han Dynasty. It is estimated that about 10,000 people resided in the state at the time. The state was relatively prosperous during the Western Zhou Dynasty, but the continuous warfare during the Spring and Autumn Period and occasional flooding near the Huai River weakened the state. The state was also sandwiched between the more powerful states of Chu, Song, and Qi at the time, which limited the political, economic, and military influence of the state as Jiang had to be vassals of these larger states in order to maintain their sovereignty.

At some point between 671 BC and 626 BC, King Cheng of Chu arranged for his younger sister, Jiang Mi to be married to the leader of the State of Jiang at the time. The State of Jiang became more wary of Chu territorial expansion, and they allied with the hegemon of China, Duke Huan of Qi in 658 BC.

Annexation by Chu 
After the death of King Cheng of Chu, Chu invaded the State of Jiang in 624 BC. The invasion was unsuccessful as the State of Jin intervened and drove Chu forces back to their homeland temporarily. In fall 623 BC, King Mu of Chu launched another invasion and successfully annexed Jiang. According to Zuo Zhuan, the annexation of Jiang deeply saddened Duke Mu of Qin.

Geography and Excavation Findings 
The territory of Jiang encompasses southern Zhengyang County, Pingqiao District in Xinyang, and northern Luoshan County. Jiang was located on the riverbanks of the Huai River. The ruins of the former Jiang capital are located in Zhengyang County and on the northern riverbanks of the Huai River. The rectangular city covers 75,000 square meters, and the distance between the easternmost and westernmost points of the city and the distance between the northernmost point and southernmost point of the city are 2 kilometers and 1.2 kilometers respectively. The city is a kilometer from the Huai River, and located on high ground. The city was called the 'Phoenix's Watchtower' in ancient times, and locals nicknamed the ruins 'watchtower' nowadays. The city was also referenced to as 'Jiang Ting' in some historical sources. Bronze tools were also found in the ruins of the city.

References

See also 
Spring and Autumn Period

Ancient Chinese states
States and territories established in the 11th century BC
States and territories disestablished in the 7th century